The mithkal or sextula (in Persian and Arabic: مثقال) is an Arabic unit of weight used in Middle East, mostly for weighing gold and Saffron. It is equivalent to a little over 4.6 grams.

Conversion

one Mithkal equal to:
4.6875 g  =   =

See also
Mithqal

References

Arabic words and phrases